State Route 378 (SR 378) is a  state highway located in Dayton, Rhea County, in the U.S. state of Tennessee.

Route description
SR 378 begins at an intersection with US 27/SR 60 and travels to the west, then marks a sharp turn and travels to the northeast toward Downtown Dayton. In downtown, it has a brief  concurrency with SR 30. It continues northward and comes to and at an interchange with US 27.

History

SR 378 follows the former route of US 27 through downtown Dayton before the 4-lane bypass was built to the southeast.

Major intersections

See also

References

378
Transportation in Rhea County, Tennessee